Genta Buana Paramita  (traded as PT. Gentabuana Paramita Film Production; formerly known as PT. Menaragading Citraperkasa) is an Indonesian production house founded in 1995 by Budhi Sutrisno. It is an Indonesian Film & TV Series production company.

Productions

Film 
 Syahadat Cinta
 Penjaga Gunung Bromo

TV Series

1993 
 Mahkota Mayangkara  (PT. Menaragading Citraperkasa)

1994 
 Mahkota Majapahit  (PT. Menaragading Citraperkasa)
 Kaca Benggala   (PT. Menaragading Citraperkasa)

1995 - 1996 
 Singgasana Brama Kumbara (PT. Menaragading Citraperkasa)

1997 
 Tutur Tinular  (Genta Buana Pitaloka)

1998 
 Misteri Gunung Merapi (Genta Buana Pitaloka)

1999 
 Tutur Tinular II (Genta Buana Pitaloka)

2000 
 Angling Dharma (Genta Buana Pitaloka)

2001 
 Misteri Gunung Merapi 2 (Genta Buana Pitaloka)

2002 
 Karmapala (Ramayana) (Genta Buana Pitaloka)
 Karmapala 2 (Mahabaratha) (Genta Buana Pitaloka)

2003 
 Angling Dharma 2 
 Misteri Gunung Merapi 3 
 Nyi Roro Kidul 
 Wali Songo
 Pengantin Lembah Hantu

2004 
 Santet 
 Jurus Halilintar 
 Lutung Kasarung 
 Mandala dari Sungai Ular

2005 
 Roro Mendut 
 Kuasa Ilahi
 Suratan Takdir 
 Misteri Dua Dunia 
 Misteri Ilahi

2006 
 Keris Empu Gandring

2007 
 Kugapai Cintamu 
 Panji 
 Tiara

2008 
 Melodi 
 Andini
 Di Antara Dua Pilihan 
 Jihan 
 Larasati
 Monalisa

2009 
 Amanda 
 Anak Membawa Berkah 
 Mukjizat Cinta 
 Pengorbanan Anggun

2010 
 Putri Duyung Marina 
 Arjuna Mencari Cinta

2011 
 Cintaku Melati 
 Tutur Tinular Versi 2011

2012 
 Kisah Sembilan Wali 
 Hikayat Ali Baba 
 Bukan Salah Takdir 
 Layla Majnun 
 Takdir Cintaku 
 Mencari Jejak Bunda 
 Kharisma

2013 
 Brama Kumbara 
 Dua Hati Satu Cinta
 Ketika Cinta Harus Memilih
 Damarwulan
 Ciung Wanara 
 Angling Dharma

2014 
 Kisah 9 Wali (Production with Transinema Pictures, Indi Kreasi, Rapi Films & Tobali Putra Productions) 
 Ksatria Pandawa 5 
 Kisah Aladin dan Lampu Wasiat 
 Panji Kelana

2015 
 Teater Legenda Indonesia 
 Dendam dari Gunung Merapi

2018 
 Misteri Gunung Merapi

References

External links 
 

Film production companies of Indonesia
Mass media companies established in 1995
Indonesian companies established in 1995